Aumontzey is a former commune in the Vosges department in northeastern France. On 1 January 2016, it was merged into the new commune Granges-Aumontzey.

See also
Communes of the Vosges department

References

Former communes of Vosges (department)